The Virginia Gold Cup and International Gold Cup steeplechase races are a celebration of hunt country tradition and two of the largest outdoor social events held in Virginia.

The Virginia Gold Cup is held the first Saturday of May at Great Meadow in The Plains, Virginia, a field events center created and bequeathed by the Arundel Family in 1984. The races have been held in Fauquier County, Virginia since 1922. Washington businessman Russell M. Arundel was chairman of the Virginia Gold Cup from 1930 to 1955, and then in 1980 his son Arthur W. "Nick" Arundel purchased Great Meadow, a 500-acre tract of open space in The Plains which he developed for more than $5 million into a new home for The Gold Cup, which at the time was threatened by development. Arundel served as Chairman of Great Meadow and of the Virginia Gold Cup for nearly two decades until his passing in 2011.

The International Gold Cup is the featured horse racing event of the Fall season and is managed today by the Virginia Gold Cup Association. Now held on the third Saturday of October, the International Gold Cup was founded in Tennessee in 1930.

The Virginia Gold Cup event was generated by eight sportsmen who met at the Fauquier Club in Warrenton and organized a four-mile race alongside the natural walls and fences of the nearby hunting countryside on April 3, 1922, and thirty four days later was the first Virginia Gold Cup race.  The 2016 event drew more than 50,000 spectators.
           	
Additional activities include terrier and pony races before the main event, hat contests on Members Hill, vendor tents and booths, parachute demonstrations, classic and new car displays, and countless tailgates. 
	
Viewing areas are divided into three basic sections:  North Rail, South Rail, and Members Hill. Members Hill overlooks Winners Circle and has the best view of the course. All three sections include private tents, public viewing areas, and tailgate spaces. North Rail is geared more toward young professionals and social groups; South Rail is where most corporate tents and family-oriented outings congregate.

Sources

Horse racing in Virginia
Fauquier County, Virginia
Recurring sporting events established in 1922
1922 establishments in Virginia